Sonia Arova (20 June 1927 – 4 February 2001), was a Bulgarian ballerina.

Biography

Early life
Sonia Arova was born as Sophie Errio on 20 June 1927 in Sofia, Bulgaria. She grew up in Sofia, she went to a ballet school, where she showed potential that the teachers she had advised her mother to take her to further her training. She began her training in Paris with Olga Preobrajenska. On holiday in Brittany in June 1940 with her best friend, June Ratcliffe, the young girls, Sophie, June and her sister Cecilia, were taken by train to Dax to escape the approaching Germans, by June's mother Andrée Ratcliffe. They eventually caught a ship to Plymouth from Bayonne; reputedly the last ship to leave, after Andrée Ratcliffe, with three children on her passport (her son was at school in England) refused to leave Sophie, as she was then called, alone on the dockside. She never saw her father again. She was reunited with her mother and sister eight years later. In England, the Ratcliffe family paid for her education at the Arts Educational Trust and she eventually joined the International Ballet in 1942.

Career
She worked as a principal ballerina in the Original Ballets Russes, the London Festival Ballet, the Royal Ballet, the National Ballet of Washington, D.C., and the American Ballet Theatre. She danced with Rudolph Nureyev in their American debut with Ruth Page's Chicago Opera Ballet troupe in New York City (1962). She was a great success, with kings and queens presenting her presents in appreciation of her work. She became Artistic Director of the National Ballet of Norway in 1966 and remained in the position until 1970.

In 1971, she co-directed the San Diego Ballet with her husband Thor Sutowski. The couple accepted teaching posts at the Alabama School of Fine Arts in 1976. During their stay, she was artistic director of the Alabama Ballet. In 1996, the pair returned to San Diego, California, where her daughter, Ariane, lived. In a ceremony at the United Nations, she was made a Dame by King Olaf V of Norway, becoming the second woman so distinguished.

Death
She died from pancreatic cancer in 2001, aged seventy-three.

References

External links
Obituary.

Sonia Arova collection Jerome Robbins Dance Division, The New York Public Library for the Performing Arts 

Prima ballerinas
1927 births
2001 deaths
Deaths from pancreatic cancer
Deaths from cancer in California
Place of death missing
Musicians from Sofia
Bulgarian emigrants to the United States
National Ballet of Washington, D.C., dancers
20th-century American dancers
Bulgarian ballet dancers